Dewas Junction railway station (station code:- DWX) is the main railway station of Dewas city in the western part of Madhya Pradesh situated on Indore-Dewas-Ujjain section. It serves Dewas city. The station consists of three platforms.

Connectivity
Dewas Junction is connected with Ujjain Junction to the north west, Indore Junction to the south-west, Maksi Junction to the north.

See also 
 Ujjain Junction
 Bhopal Junction
 Indore Junction
 Maksi Junction
 Binjana

References 

Railway junction stations in Madhya Pradesh
Dewas
Ratlam railway division
Railway stations in Dewas district